Glass batch calculation or glass batching is used to determine the correct mix of raw materials (batch) for a glass melt.

Principle
The raw materials mixture for glass melting is termed "batch".  The batch must be measured properly to achieve a given, desired glass formulation. This batch calculation is based on the common linear regression equation:

with NB and NG being the molarities 1-column matrices of the batch and glass components respectively, and B being the batching matrix. The symbol "T" stands for the matrix transpose operation, "−1" indicates matrix inversion, and the sign "·" means the scalar product. From the molarities matrices N, percentages by weight (wt%) can easily be derived using the appropriate molar masses.

Example calculation
An example batch calculation may be demonstrated here. The desired glass composition in wt% is: 67 SiO2, 12 Na2O, 10 CaO, 5 Al2O3, 1 K2O, 2 MgO, 3 B2O3, and as raw materials are used sand, trona, lime, albite, orthoclase, dolomite, and borax. The formulas and molar masses of the glass and batch components are listed in the following table:

The batching matrix B indicates the relation of the molarity in the batch (columns) and in the glass (rows). For example, the batch component SiO2 adds 1 mol SiO2 to the glass, therefore, the intersection of the first column and row shows "1". Trona adds 1.5 mol Na2O to the glass; albite adds 6 mol SiO2, 1 mol Na2O, and 1 mol Al2O3, and so on. For the example given above, the complete batching matrix is listed below. The molarity matrix NG of the glass is simply determined by dividing the desired wt% concentrations by the appropriate molar masses, e.g., for SiO2 67/60.0843 = 1.1151.

            

The resulting molarity matrix of the batch, NB, is given here. After multiplication with the appropriate molar masses of the batch ingredients one obtains the batch mass fraction matrix MB:

               or   

The matrix MB, normalized to sum up to 100% as seen above, contains the final batch composition in wt%: 39.216 sand, 16.012 trona, 10.242 lime, 16.022 albite, 4.699 orthoclase, 7.276 dolomite, 6.533 borax. If this batch is melted to a glass, the desired composition given above is obtained. During glass melting, carbon dioxide (from trona, lime, dolomite) and water (from trona, borax) evaporate.

Simple glass batch calculation can be found at the website of the University of Washington.

Advanced batch calculation by optimization
If the number of glass and batch components is not equal, if it is impossible to exactly obtain the desired glass composition using the selected batch ingredients, or if the matrix equation is not soluble for other reasons (i.e., the rows/columns are linearly dependent), the batch composition must be determined by optimization techniques.

See also
 Glass ingredients
 Calculation of glass properties

References

Glass engineering and science
Glass chemistry